Chaar Yaar or Char Yaar (meaning "Four Friends" in Persian) is used to refer to:

 Rashidun, the Rightly Guided Caliphs, used in Sunni Islam to refer to the first four Caliphs who established the Rashidun Caliphate
Abu Bakr (632–634 AD) through his daughter Aisha became a father-in-law of Muhammad.
 Umar ibn al-Khattab, (Umar І) (634–644 AD) through his daughter Hafsa became a father-in-law of Muhammad.
 Uthman ibn Affan (644–656 AD) by marrying Ruqayyah and Umm Kulthum two daughters of Muhammad became a son-in-law of Muhammad.
 Ali ibn Abi Talib (656–661 AD) by marrying Fatimah and Umamah daughter and grand daughter of Muhammad became a son-in-law of Muhammad.

 The great pioneers of the 13th century Chisti and Suhrawardiyya Sufi movements in South Asia were four friends known as "Chaar Yaar". The original four were:
 Baha-ud-din Zakariya of Multan (1170–1267 AD)
 Baba Farid Shakar Ganj of Pakpattan (1174–1266 AD)
 Lal Shahbaz Qalandar aka Jhulelal of Sehwan (1177–1274 AD)
 Syed Jalaluddin Bukhari of Uch Shareef (c. 1192–1291 AD)

 However, later on, there were more than just four of them in Punjabi Sufi iconography. Including Khwaja Moinuddin Chisti, they include:
 Moinuddin Chishti of Ajmer, India (1141–1230 AD)
 Nizamuddin Auliya of Delhi India (1238–1325 AD)